Allisson is a variant form of the given name Alison. Notable people with the name include:

Allisson Lozz (born 1992), Mexican actress, model, and singer
Allisson Ricardo (born 1988), Brazilian footballer

See also
Alisson (disambiguation)
Allison (disambiguation)